Charles Lee Shelley (born May 17, 1956) is an American fencer. He competed in the épée events at the 1984 and 1988 Summer Olympics.

See also
List of Princeton University Olympians
List of USFA Division I National Champions

References

External links
 

1956 births
Living people
American male épée fencers
Olympic fencers of the United States
Fencers at the 1984 Summer Olympics
Fencers at the 1988 Summer Olympics
Sportspeople from Beaumont, Texas
Pan American Games medalists in fencing
Pan American Games gold medalists for the United States
Pan American Games silver medalists for the United States
Fencers at the 1979 Pan American Games
Fencers at the 1987 Pan American Games